The Czech Social Democratic Party (ČSSD) leadership election of 1993 was held on 28 February 1993. Miloš Zeman was elected new leader of ČSSD. Zeman defeated Jiří Paroubek, Petr Miller and Pavel Novák who was endorsed by incumbent leader Jiří Horák. Zeman and Paroubek qualified but Paroubek dropped out of the election and Pavel Novák took his place in the second round.

Jiří Paroubek represented so-called "Rakovník wing" in ČSSD that supported centrist orientation of the party. Zeman was more left-wing candidate. Zeman's wing was more radical against ODS. The third wing was called Centrist and its stances were somewhere between the other two wings. It was represented by Pavel Novák. Petr Miller was not part of any wing and his support was minimal. 407 delegates were allowed to vote. Candidate needed to gain at least 204 votes to win.

Results

References

Czech Social Democratic Party leadership elections
Czech Social Democratic Party leadership election
Czech Social Democratic Party leadership election
Indirect elections
Czech Social Democratic Party leadership election